Pleasant Township is a township in Butler County, Kansas, USA.  As of the 2000 census, its population was 4,649.

History
Pleasant Township was organized in 1873.

Geography
According to the USGS, it contains two cemeteries: Dunlap and Rose Hill.

Transportation
Pleasant Township contains three airports or landing strips: Flying H Ranch Airport, Graham Airport and Trabue Airport.

Further reading

References

 USGS Geographic Names Information System (GNIS)

External links
 City-Data.com

Townships in Butler County, Kansas
Townships in Kansas